James E. Ransome (born September 25, 1961) is an American illustrator of children's books.

Biography
He was born in North Carolina. During high school years the family moved to Bergenfield, New Jersey; he attended film making and photography classes, which influenced his style. He obtained a Batchelor of Fine Arts degree from Pratt Institute in Brooklyn, New York, where his mentor was the illustrator Jerry Pinkney.

James Ransome has illustrated over 60 picture books, and has illustrated greetings cards and magazines. Commissioned murals include three for the National Underground Railroad Freedom Center in Cincinnati, Ohio.

He is an associate professor in the School of Art at Syracuse University. He and his wife, author Lesa Cline-Ransome, and family live in Rhinebeck, New York.

Bibliography 

 Picture Books
 text by Eve Bunting
 Your Move (HMH, 1998)
 Peepers, text by Eve Bunting (HMH, 2001)
 text by Jacqueline Woodson
 Visiting Day (Scholastic, 2001)
 This Is the Rope: A Story From the Great Migration (Nancy Paulson, 2013)
 text by Deborah Hopkinson
 Under the Quilt of Night (Aladdin, 2002)
 Sky Boys: How They Built the Empire State Building (Schwarz and Wade, 2004)
 text by Lesa Cline-Ransome
 Quilt Alphabet (Holiday House, 2002)
 Quilt Counting (Chronicle Books, 2002)
 Satchel Paige (Aladdin, 2003)
 Major Taylor, Champion Cyclist (Atheneum, 2003)
 Young Pele: Soccer's First Star (Schwartz & Wade, 2007)
 Helen Keller: The World in Her Heart (Collins Publishers, 2008)
 Before There Was Mozart: The Story of Joseph Boulogne, Chevalier de Saint-George (Schwartz & Wade, 2011)
 Words Set Me Free: The Story of Young Frederick Douglass (Simon & Schuster, 2012)
 Light in the Darkness: A Story about How Slaves Learned in Secret (Jump at the Sun, 2013)
 Benny Goodman & Teddy Wilson: Taking the Stage as the First Black-And-White Jazz Band in History (Holiday House, 2014)
 My Story, My Dance: Robert Battle's Journey to Alvin Ailey (Paula Wiseman Books, 2015)
 Freedom's School (Paula Wiseman Books, 2015)
 Just a Lucky So and So: The Story of Louis Armstrong (Holiday House, 2016)
 Before She Was Harriet (Holiday House, 2017)
 Germs: Sickness, Bad Breath, and Pizza (Henry Holt, 2017)
 Game Changers: The Story of Venus and Serena Williams (Paula Wiseman Books, 2018
 self-authored and self-illustrated
 Gunner, Football Hero (Holiday House, 2010)
 A Joyful Christmas: A Treasury of New and Classic Songs, Poems, and Stories for the Holiday (Henry Holt, 2010)
 New Red Bike! (Holiday House, 2011)
 My Teacher (Dial Books, 2012)
 The Bell Rang (Caitlyn Dlouhy Books, 2019)
 Uncle Jed's Barbershop, text by Margaree King Mitchell (Aladdin, 1998)
 Red Dancing Shoes, text by Denise Lewis Patrick (HarperCollins, 1993)
 My Best Shoes, text by Marilee Robin Burton (HarperCollins, 1994)
 That Cat!, text by Eve B. Feldman (Tambourine Books, 1994)
 Ziggy and the Black Dinosaurs, text by Sharon M. Draper (1994)
 Freedom's Fruit, text by William H. Hooks (Knopf, 1995)
 Bonesy and Isabel, text by Michael J. Rosen (Harcourt, 1995)
 Celie and the Harvest Fiddler, text by Vanessa Flournoy, Valerie Flournoy (HarperCollins Publishers, 1995)
 Bimmi Finds a Cat, text by Elisabeth J. Stewart (Clarion, 1996)
 The Wagon, text by Tony Johnston (Mulberry Books, 1996)
 Dark Day, Light Night, text by Jan Carr (Hyperion, 1996)
 Eli and the Swamp Man, text by Charlotte Sherman (HarperCollins Publishers, 1996)
 How Many Stars in the Sky?, text by Lenny Hort (Reading Rainbow Books, 1997)
 The Jukebox Man, text by Jacqueline K. Ogburn (Dial, 1998)
 Let My People Go: Bible Stories Told by a Freeman of Color, text by Patricia C. McKissack, Fredrick L. McKissack Jr. (Atheneum, 1998)
 Quinnie Blue, text by Dinah Johnson (Henry Holt, 2000)
 The Secret of the Stones, text by Robert D. San Souci (Dial, 2000)
 How Animals Saved the People: Animal Tales from the South, text by J.J. Reneaux (HarperCollins, 2001)
 Building a New Land: African Americans in Colonial America, text by James Haskins, Kathleen Benson (Amistad, 2001)
 Bruh Rabbit and the Tar Baby Girl, text by Virginia Hamilton (Blue Sky Press, 2003)
 A Pride of African Tales, text by Donna L. Washington (Amistad, 2003)
 This Is the Dream, text by Diane Z. Shore, Jessica Alexander (Amistad, 2005)
 It Is the Wind, text by Ferida Wolff (HarperCollins Publishers, 2005)
 What Lincoln Said, text by Sarah L. Thomson (HarperCollins, 2008)
 Our Children Can Soar: A Celebration of Rosa, Barack, and the Pioneers of Change, text by Michelle Cook (Bloomsbury Children's, 2009)
 Baby Blessings: A Prayer for the Day You Are Born, text by Deloris Jordan (Paula Wiseman, 2010)
 When Grandmama Sings, text by Margaree King Mitchell (HarperCollins, 2012)
 The Christmas Tugboat: How the Rockefeller Center Christmas Tree Came to New York City, text by George Matteson, Adele Ursone (Clarion, 2012)
 Joltin' Joe DiMaggio, text by Jonah Winter (Atheneum, 2014)
 Granddaddy's Turn: A Journey to the Ballot Box, text by Michael S. Bandy, Eric Stein (Candlewick Press, 2015)
 My Name Is Truth: The Life of Sojourner Truth, text by Ann Turner (HarperCollins, 2015)
 Middle Grade
 in We Rise, We Resist, We Raise Our Voices, text by Lesa Cline-Ransome (Crown Books for Young Readers, 2018)

Awards

 1994 Coretta Scott King Award Illustrator Honor for Uncle Jed's Barbershop (text by Margaree King Mitchell)
 1999 NAACP Image Award for Outstanding Literary Work, Children's for Let My People Go: Bible Stories Told By A Freeman Of Color (text by Patricia McKissack and Fredrick McKissack).
 1995 Coretta Scott King Award Illustrator Award for The Creation (text by James Weldon Johnson)
 2018 Coretta Scott King Award Illustrator Honor for Before She Was Harriet: The Story of Harriet Tubman (text by Lesa Cline-Ransome).

References

External links
 Official website

1961 births
Living people
American children's book illustrators
African-American illustrators
Artists from North Carolina
Pratt Institute alumni
Syracuse University faculty
21st-century African-American people
20th-century African-American people